The wind generation potential in the United States far exceeds demand. There are only two states with no commercially significant wind power potential, Mississippi and Florida. Florida has the potential to install 900 MW at 25% capacity factor -high turbines, and Mississippi the potential to install 30,000 MW at 25% capacity factor -high turbines. For commercial operation, a capacity factor of at least 35% is preferred. There are no locations in either state that would achieve 30% capacity factor. In contrast, North Dakota, the windiest state, has the capacity to install 200,000 MW at 50% capacity factor -high turbines. Texas, although not as windy, is larger, and has the capacity to install 250,000 MW at 50% capacity factor, and 1,757,355.6 MW of at least 35% capacity factor, capable of generating 6,696,500 GWh/year, more than all of the electricity generated in the United States in 2010.

By the end of 2011, the United States had installed 46,919 MW of wind power, and generated 94,652 GWh of electricity from wind power in 2010.

The annual production of a wind turbine is a product of the capacity rating, the capacity factor, and the number of hours in a year. A 200 MW wind farm at 35% capacity factor will generate approximately 613.2 GWh/year.

The United States generated 4,125,060 GWh of electricity in 2010.

N/A = Not Available

NA = Not Applicable (no shoreline)

The United States has trailed other countries in the development of off-shore wind farms, and it is possible that the first off-shore wind farm in the United States will be installed in either New England or New Jersey in 2013. Other locations that could be the first are Virginia, Maryland, and Texas.

See also

 Wind power in the United States

References

External links
Wind Map

Wind power in the United States